David Fanning may refer to:

 David Fanning (footballer) (born 1984), Australian rules footballer
 David Fanning (loyalist) (1755–1825), loyalist of the American Revolution in North Carolina
 David Fanning (musicologist), music professor and musicologist specializing on the music of Carl Nielsen and Dmitri Shostakovich
 David Fanning (singer), American country musician and record producer
 Dave Fanning (born 1955), Irish television and radio personality
 David Fanning (journalist) (born 1946), South African journalist; executive producer, Frontline, 1983–2015